This is a list of media publications and sources in Louisville, Kentucky.

Newspapers, magazines and online news

The local daily newspaper in Louisville is The Courier-Journal, a property of the Gannett chain.

Local weekly newspapers include Business First of Louisville, Louisville Defender (African American paper published since 1933), Louisville Eccentric Observer (or LEO, a free alternative paper) and The Voice-Tribune.

Louisville Magazine, published monthly, highlights the city's culture and lifestyles. Other locally produced monthly magazines include Food & Dining Magazine, which covers regional food and drink, and Today's Woman, a national magazine featuring women and women's issues.

Macaroni Kid Louisville East is a local online news source covering family friendly events, businesses, activities, festivals, guides and more. 

Insider Louisville is a locally owned online news source covering business, government, neighborhoods, arts and culture in Metro Louisville. They deliver a free daily newsletter.

Television 

Louisville is also well served by television. Louisville's television stations include:

The only cable service available in Louisville is from Charter Communications (doing business as Spectrum). They provide standard and premium cable TV service, high-speed Internet access and digital telephone service.

Radio

FM radio 
Louisville's radio broadcasting stations cater to a wide variety of musical and other interests.

AM radio

See also
 Kentucky media
 List of newspapers in Kentucky
 List of radio stations in Kentucky
 List of television stations in Kentucky
 Media of cities in Kentucky: Bowling Green, Lexington

References

Bibliography

External links 
 
 Radio-Locator

 
Louisville
Media
Louisville